Events from the year 1843 in Denmark.

Incumbents
 Monarch – Christian VIII
 Prime minister – Poul Christian Stemann

Events

 18 May – first public meeting at Skamlingsbanken.
 30 May  Queen Alexandrine Bridge between Zealand and Møn is unaugurated.
 16 August – Georg Carstensen Tivoli Gardens in Copenhagen are inaugurated with 3.615 visitors on the opening day. At the end of the 1843 season, more than 175,000 guests have visited the park.
 15 December  The Barony of Adelersborg is established by G.F.O. Zytphen-Adeler and Bertha Henriette Frederikke Løvenskiold from the manors of Dragsholm and Dønnerup.

Undated

Culture

Literature
 20 February – Søren Kierkegaard publishes Either/Or,

Births
 24 January – Evald Tang Kristensen, author and folklore collector (died 1929)
 25 February – Christian Ditlev Ammentorp Hansen, pharmacist and industrialist (died 1916)
 31 March – Christian Zacho, painter (died 1913)
 8 April – Asger Hamerik, composer (died 1923)
 3 June – King Frederick VIII (died 1912)
 7 November
 Erhard Frederiksen, agriculturalist (died 1903)
 Emil Vett, businessman (died 1911)

Deaths
 18 January – Princess Louise Auguste, princess of Denmark, Duchesof Augustenborg (born 1771)

References

 
1840s in Denmark
Denmark
Years of the 19th century in Denmark